Piracaia is a municipality in the state of São Paulo in Brazil. The population is 27,462 (2020 est.) in an area of 386 km². The elevation is 792 m. The municipality was established in 1859 as Santo Antônio da Cachoeira, but its name was changed into Piracaia on August 20, 1906.

References

Municipalities in São Paulo (state)